Olivia Arben is a British model  who has appeared on the cover of Vogue Magazine, Numéro Magazine, Harper's Bazaar, Elle Magazine, L'Officiel and Glamour magazine.

Early life
Arben attended Cranleigh School in Surrey. After completing school, she joined London College of Fashion. Her sister, Natasha Arben is a Twitch partner, gamer and makeup YouTuber.

Career
Arben started her modelling career at the age of 15, she made her first appearance in the L’Oreal Colour Trophy. After the death of her father, when she was 16, Olivia joined the British Heart Foundation as an Ambassador. During her early modeling career, Arben appeared in magazines, including Country and Townhouse Magazine, Arcadia, Maxim, Esquire, Vogue Italia, and Vogue UK online, as well as appearing on the front covers of  L'Officiel Baltic, and  YOU magazine.

During her career, Arben has modelled for brands including L’Oreal, Triangl Swim, Joshua Kane Bespoke, Steve Madden, Harvey Nichols, Timberland, Needle & Thread, Juicy Couture, Pronovias, Rami Kadi, The Deck, and NFL Europe Super Bowl 2017 EU Clothing Campaign, Olivia's first brand collaboration, Olivia Arben X Terry De Havilland, The Rebel Collection was launched October 2022.

Olivia was voted one of the best dressed at the Cannes film festival 2018 by Elle USA magazine. 

Arben has walked London, New York, Paris & Berlin Fashion Week for designers such as Rami Kadi, Malan Breton, Roland Mouret, Hervé Leger, Joshua Kane and Jean Gritsfeldt.

As of 2022, Arben is one of the top 100 most followed models according to models.com She has also been ranked on their Trending & Runway lists.

Personal life
On 19 May 2019 Olivia got engaged to her long-term boyfriend Nico Cary, an entrepreneur, at Hotel Du Cap Eden Roc during the Cannes Film Festival. They were married on 28 August 2021 at Goodwood House. The wedding was covered by Hello! Magazine U.K.

References

External links

1997 births
Living people
People educated at Cranleigh School
Alumni of the London College of Fashion
English female models